The Rugby Americas North Women's Sevens, or RAN Women's Sevens, is the regional championship for women's international rugby sevens in North America and the Caribbean. The tournament is held over two days, typically on a weekend in November. It is sanctioned and sponsored by Rugby Americas North, which is the rugby union governing body for the region. Prior to 2016, it was referred to as the North America and Caribbean Women's Sevens.

Rugby sevens — also known as 7-a-side, or 7s — is a short form of the sport of rugby union that was first played in 1883. The first (men's) internationals took place in 1973. As women's rugby union developed in the 1960s and 1970s the format became very popular as it allowed games, and entire leagues, to be developed in countries even when player numbers were small, and it remains the main form the women's game is played in most parts of the world.

However, although the first women's international rugby union 15-a-side test match took place in 1982, it was not until 1997 before the first women's international 7s tournaments were played, when the 1997 Hong Kong Sevens included a women's tournament for the first time. Over the next decade the number of tournaments grew, with almost every region developing regular championship competitions. This reached its zenith with 2009's inaugural women's tournament for the Rugby World Cup Sevens, shortly followed by the announcement that women's rugby sevens will be included in the Olympics from 2016.

The first official regional 7s championship for international women's teams from North America and the Caribbean was held in Barbados in 2005. The tournament was run by the North America and West Indies Rugby Association (NAWIRA), which later became the North America Caribbean Rugby Association (NACRA) before adopting its current name of Rugby Americas North in 2016. The regional 7s championships have periodically served as pre-qualifying competitions for the Rugby 7s World Cup, or other sevens tournaments.

The following are details of all regional women's international championships played in North America and the Caribbean, listed chronologically with the earliest first, with all result details, where known (included are the NACRA Women's Sevens and other official regional championships, e.g. NAWIRA Women's Sevens tournaments).

Honours

Tournaments

NAWIRA Tournament 2005 
Venue/Date: 19–20 November 2005, Barbados Summarised
POOL A

Guyana 12-10 St Vincent
St Lucia 15-5 Barbados
Jamaica 17-0 St Vincent
USA 36-0 Trinidad and Tobago
Guyana 29-0 Barbados
St Vincent 10-7 St Lucia
Jamaica 10-0 Guyana
Trinidad and Tobago 46-0 Barbados
USA 46-0 St Lucia
Trinidad and Tobago 19-10 Jamaica
USA 38-0 Guyana
Jamaica 29-0 St Lucia
St Vincent 37-5 Barbados
Trinidad and Tobago 12-5 Guyana
USA 38-0 St Vincent
Jamaica 48-0 Barbados
Trinidad and Tobago 24-0 St Lucia
USA 52-0 Barbados
Guyana 15-0 St Lucia
Trinidad and Tobago 26-5 St Vincent
USA 40-5 Jamaica

Special Exhibition Match

NAWIRA Tournament 2006 
Date/Venue: 11–12 November 2006, Garrison Savannah, Barbados.  (Source NAWIRA)
Participants: Barbados, Jamaica, Guyana, Trinidad & Tobago, St. Lucia, St. Vincent

Day 1 Match Schedule
USA Development Eagles 22-0 Jamaica
Trinidad & Tobago 14-5 Guyana
Barbados 0-41 USA Development Eagles
Barbados 0-34 Jamaica
USA Development 19-0 Guyana
Trinidad & Tobago 25-0 Saint Lucia
Barbados 0-34 Guyana
USA Development Eagles 41-0 Saint Lucia
Day 2 Match Schedule
Guyana 0-0 Jamaica
Barbados 0-42 Trinidad & Tobago
Jamaica 34-0 Saint Lucia
USA Development Eagles 24-0 Trinidad & Tobago
Barbados 5-25 Saint Lucia
Guyana 36-0 Saint Lucia
Jamaica 26-5 Trinidad & Tobago

There were no extra classification games

NAWIRA Tournament 2007 
Date/Venue: 17–18 November 2007, at Winton Rugby Centre, Nassau, Bahamas.

Participants: USA Developing Eagles, Canada Development, Guyana, and Jamaica.  Trinidad & Tobago were a late withdrawal. (Source NAWIRA) Summarised

MatchesDay 1 Match Schedule
USA Dev Eagles 12-0 Jamaica
USA Dev Eagles 7-5 Guyana
Canada 22-0 Jamaica
Guyana 10-24 Canada
Guyana 0-10 Jamaica
USA Dev Eagles 7-17 Canada
Day 2 Match Schedule
Canada 21-0 Jamaica
USA Dev Eagles 24-0 Guyana
USA Dev Eagles 12-0 Jamaica
Guyana 0-38 Canada
USA Dev Eagles 15-19 Canada
Guyana 0-12 Jamaica

There were no extra classification games

NAWIRA World Cup Qualifier 2008
Venue/Date: Nassau, Bahamas, 25–26 October 2008. World Cup qualifiers, two to qualify for Dubai.

Originally there were three groups of three but due to the very late withdrawal of St Vincent and the Grenadines it became two groups of four.

Group StagesPOOL A

USA 45-0 Bermuda
Trinidad & Tobago 5-0 Guyana
Guyana 41-7 Bermuda
USA 52-0 Trinidad & Tobago
USA 45-0 Guyana
Trinidad & Tobago 36-0 Bermuda
POOL B

Jamaica 39-0 Barbados
Canada 53-0 Cayman Islands
Jamaica 48-0 Cayman Islands
Canada 57-0 Barbados
Canada 29-0 Jamaica
Barbados 10-5 Cayman Islands
Classification StagesQuarter Finals
USA 67-0 Cayman Islands
Jamaica 0-12 Guyana
Barbados 0-34 Trinidad & Tobago
Bermuda 0-34 Canada
Bowl Semi Finals
Jamaica 34-0 Cayman Islands
Barbados 10-10 Bermuda (Bermuda score SD try)
Shield Final (7th)
Cayman Islands 10-5 Barbados
Bowl Final (5th)
Jamaica 53-0 Bermuda
Cup Semi Finals
USA 59-0 Guyana
Canada 41-0 Trinidad & Tobago
Plate Final (3rd)
Guyana 15-5 Trinidad & Tobago
Cup Final (1st)
USA 14-14 Canada (Canada score SD try)

NACRA Tournament 2009 
Date/Venue: November 14–15, Mexico City, Mexico. Guyana, St Lucia, Cayman, Mexico and Bahamas took part.

Day 1 Match Schedule
Mexico 12-5 Cayman Islands
Guyana 17-10 Saint Lucia
Guyana 24-0 Cayman Islands
Saint Lucia 22-0 Bahamas
Mexico 5-12 Saint Lucia
Guyana 45-0 Bahamas
Mexico 12-17 Bahamas
Saint Lucia 15-0 Cayman Islands
Cayman Islands 22-12 Bahamas
Mexico 5-33 Guyana
Day 2 Match Schedule
Mexico 12-12 Saint Lucia
Guyana 47-0 Bahamas
Mexico 0-27 Guyana
Cayman Islands 10-5 Bahamas
Mexico 27-7 Bahamas
Saint Lucia 19-5 Cayman Islands
Saint Lucia v Bahamas (not played)
Guyana 26-0 Cayman Islands
Mexico 19-12 Cayman Islands
Guyana 19-0 Saint Lucia

There were no extra classification games

NACRA Sevens Championship 2010
26–27 July 2010, at Georgetown, Guyana
Pool stage
Cayman  7-10 Mexico
Trinidad & Tobago  5-5 Jamaica
Guyana  46-0 Mexico
Cayman 0-36 Jamaica
Trinidad & Tobago  27-0 St Lucia
Guyana  0-0 Jamaica
Cayman  0-12 St Lucia
Trinidad & Tobago  31-7 Mexico
Guyana 10-0 St Lucia
Guyana 46-0 Cayman
St Lucia  10-0 Mexico
Cayman 0-43 Trinidad & Tobago
Mexico  12- 19 Jamaica
Guyana  12-0 Trinidad & Tobago
St Lucia  0  15 Jamaica
Seedings After Round Robin Tournament:

1st Seed, Guyana, 14 pts
2nd Seed, Jamaica, 13 pts
3rd Seed, Trinidad & Tobago, 12 pts
4th Seed, St Lucia, 9 pts
5th Seed, Mexico, 7 pts
6th Seed, Cayman, 5 pts

Semi-finals
Jamaica 7-12 Trinidad & Tobago
Guyana 21-0 St Lucia

5th place
Mexico 26-5 Cayman
3rd place
Jamaica 22-0 St Lucia
Final
Guyana 14-12 Trinidad & Tobago

NACRA Sevens Championship 2011
12–13 November 2011, at Bridgetown, Barbados
Pool A

Guyana 5-0 Mexico
St Lucia 7-19 USA South
Mexico 0-19 USA South
St Lucia 10-0 Barbados
Guyana 7-14 USA South
Mexico 5-0 Barbados
USA South 22-0 Barbados
Guyana 5-5 St Lucia
Guyana 39-0 Barbados
St Lucia 5-0 Mexico

Pool B

Trinidad & Tobago 50-0 St Vincent
Jamaica 15-0 Guadeloupe
Maple Leafs 52-0 Guadeloupe
Cayman 22-5 St Vincent
Trinidad & Tobago 12-0 Cayman
Jamaica 0-38 Maple Leafs
Trinidad & Tobago 5-26 Maple Leafs
Jamaica 17-0 Cayman
Jamaica 30-0 St Vincent
Trinidad & Tobago 34-0 Guadeloupe
Cayman 0-60 Maple Leafs
St Vincent 5-7 Guadeloupe
Classification Stages9th/11th Ranking Round-robin

Barbados 12-0 St Vincent
Guadeloupe 5-5 St Vincent
Barbados 10-14 Guadeloupe

Cup Quarter Finals
USA South 31 - 0 Cayman Islands 
Maple Leafs 26 - 0 Mexico
Jamaica 15 - 10 Guyana (in sudden death)
Trinidad & Tobago 5 - 0 St Lucia

Plate semi-finals
Cayman 5-10 Guyana
Mexico 5-10 St Lucia

7th/8th Place Playoff 
Mexico 27-10 Cayman

Plate final(5th/6th) 
Guyana 26-0 St Lucia

Cup semi-finals
USA South 5-26 Jamaica
Maple Leafs 17-0 Trinidad & Tobago

3rd/4th Playoff
Trinidad & Tobago 14-10 USA South

Final
Jamaica 0-38 Maple Leafs

NACRA World Cup Qualifier 2012
Venue/Date: Ottawa, Canada, 25–26 August 2012. World Cup qualifiers, winner to qualify for Dubai.

Originally six teams entered but the late withdrawal of Guyana resulted in a redraw and a single pool.

Pool Stages
Canada 62-0 Mexico
Jamaica 17-0 Cayman Islands
Canada 50-0 Cayman Islands
Jamaica 19-7 Trinidad & Tobago
Canada 45-0 Jamaica
Trinidad & Tobago 25-12 Mexico
Canada 39-0 Trinidad & Tobago
Mexico 35-0 Cayman Islands
Jamaica 24-0 Mexico
Trinidad & Tobago 36-0 Cayman Islands
Semi-finals
Trinidad & Tobago 22 - 5 Jamaica
Canada 42 - 0 Mexico

FINAL
Canada 46 - 0 Trinidad & Tobago

Notes

 
 
Women's rugby sevens competitions
Rugby union competitions in North America
Rugby union competitions in the Caribbean
Women's rugby union competitions for national teams
2005 establishments in North America
Women's rugby union in North America